South High School was a public high school in the Akron Public Schools that served the city of Akron, Ohio, from 1911 until its closure at the end of the 1979–80 school year. School colors were blue and white and athletic teams were known as the Cavaliers or Big Blue. They competed in the Akron City Series for their entire existence.

History
South High School was originally built in 1911 at 30 West Thornton Street at Coburn and was the second of 14 high schools to be built over the course of Akron Public School district's existence. The newer building on East Avenue was completed in 1956. Once the building at 1055 East Avenue was finished, the original building became Thornton Junior High School and housed grades seven through nine until its closure at the end of the 1978–1979 school year. The building at West Thornton and Coburn was eventually demolished in 1997 and the land now houses an Aldi's discount supermarket. After South was closed in 1980, it reopened in 1993 as the Miller South School for the Visual and Performing Arts. It was named in honor of Akron's first African-American principal, George C. Miller.

State championships

 Boys cross country – 1939

Notable alumni
 Ara Parseghian, Cleveland Browns football player and Notre Dame football coach

Notes and references

External links
 APS page for Miller South
 District website

High schools in Akron, Ohio
Public high schools in Ohio
Defunct schools in Ohio